Peter Brown (born 8 December 1957) is a former Australian rules footballer who played for Fitzroy in the Victorian Football League (VFL) between 1977 and 1980. He then played with Glenelg in the South Australian National Football League in 1981, playing 14 games and kicking 16 goals, before he returned to Melbourne and played for Old Scotch in the Victorian Amateur Football Association.

References

External links

1957 births
Living people
Fitzroy Football Club players
Glenelg Football Club players
Old Scotch Football Club players
People educated at Scotch College, Melbourne
Australian rules footballers from Victoria (Australia)